Scott County Central High School is a high school at 20794 US Highway 61 Sikeston, Missouri, Scott County, Missouri.

The school colors are black and orange and the mascot is the Braves.

The High School has an enrollment of 151.

The school was created in 1958 by the merger of the Morley, Missouri, Blodgett, Missouri, Haywood City, Missouri and Vanduser, Missouri high schools. The school colors were retained from the original Vanduser High School (black and orange) and Morley High School (black and white).  It competes in the Scott-Mississippi Conference.

Scott County competes in Class 2 and is a member of the Missouri State High School Activities Association.

Notable alumni
Marcus Timmons, 1991, basketball player 
Otto Porter, 2011, basketball player

References

External links
scottcentral.k12.mo.us

Public high schools in Missouri
Schools in Scott County, Missouri
Education in Scott County, Missouri
Educational institutions established in 1958
1958 establishments in Missouri